Followers of Christianity are a significant minority in Odisha state of India.  According to the 2011 Census, Christians make up about 2.77% of the population (about 1,160,000 people). Kurukh, Sora, Kharia and Panos are notable ethnic groups with a significant Christian population.

Denominations 
Church of God (Anderson), Council of Baptist Churches in Northern India, Evangelical Missionary Society in Mayurbhanj and Jeypore Evangelical Lutheran Church are among the Protestant denominations of Odisha. Christ Church the full Gospel Church, Gospel Outreach Ministries, India Evangelistic Association, Orissa Baptist Evangelistic Crusade and The Pentecostal Mission  are among the non-Catholic denominations of Odisha as well. 

The Church of North India is present in Odisha as well with the
dioceses of Cuttack, Phulbani, and Sambalpur.  The diocese of Chota Nagpur also serves a small part of
Odisha. and Christian Revival Church is also serving.

Bible translations into Odia 
The first version in the Odia language of India was translated by William Carey in 1808 and was distributed among pilgrims at Puri to introduce them to Christianity. Then came the standard version by Amos Sutton in the 1840s.

Roman Catholic Church 
The archbishop of Roman Catholic Archdiocese of Cuttack-Bhubaneswar is Archbishop John Barwa. 
Its suffragan dioceses are: 
 Balasore
 Berhampur
 Rourkela
 Sambalpur
 Rayagada

Statistics

2011 census

Demographics
The Christians are mostly from the adivasi or tribal communities of the state with 8,16,981 Christians among STs and the major tribes are as below with number of Christians and percentage of Christians in each tribe.

Places with the largest proportions
The figures indicate % of Christians within the districts:

 Gajapati
 Serango– 84% 
 Adava– 75%
 R.Udayagiri– 50%

 Kandhamal
 Brahmanigaon– 72% 
 Daringbadi– 64%
 Kotagarh– 58%

 Sundargarh
 Raiboga– 62%

 Rayagada
 Puttasing– 80%
 Chandrapur– 51%

See also 
 Christianity in India
Christian Revival Church

References 

 
Religion in Odisha